Karadpally is a village in Kamareddy district, Telangana, India.

Geography of karadpally village 
 Village             :Karadpally
  Block               :Tadwai
 District            :Kamareddy
  State               :Telangana
 Country             :India 
 Continent           :Asia 
 Time Zone           :IST ( UTC + 05:30) 
 Currency            :Indian Rupee ( INR )
 Dialing Code        :+91
 Date format         :dd/mm/yyyy
 Driving             :side left
 Internet            :country code top-level domain (cTLD) .in
 Language            :Telugu, Urdu, English, Marathi
 Time difference     :17 minutes
 Latitude            :18.3624949
 Longitude           :78.1828055

Description About Village 

Karadpally is a village panchayat located in the Kamareddy district of Telangana state. The geocoordinates of Karapally are latitude 18.3624949 and longitude 78.1828055.  Karadpally village is located in the state of Telangana. The other surrounding state capitals are Bhopal 548.4 km, Mumbai 568.8 km, Bangalore 602.3 km
Hyderabad is main city for this village people many people working and staying there this city 140 km

References

Villages in Kamareddy district